This article contains a list of fossil-bearing stratigraphic units in the state of Oregon, U.S.

Lists of fossiliferous stratigraphic units

Cenozoic

Mesozoic

Paleozoic

See also 

 Paleontology in Oregon
 Lists of Oregon-related topics

References 

Oregon
 
Stratigraphy of Oregon
Oregon geography-related lists
United States geology-related lists